José Iván Agusto Briones (8 May 1961 – 23 May 2021) was an Ecuadorian politician who served as Minister of Energy.

References

1961 births
2021 deaths
2021 suicides
Ecuadorian civil engineers
Energy ministers of Ecuador
Universidad Católica de Santiago de Guayaquil alumni
University of Valparaíso alumni
People from Guayaquil
Suicides by hanging in Ecuador
Energy ministers